Eduarda Cuiza Lea (born 5 January 1980) is a Bolivian footballer who plays as a forward for the Bolivia women's national team.

Early life
Cuiza hails from the Potosí Department.

International career
Cuiza played for Bolivia at senior level in two Copa América Femenina editions (2014 and 2018).

References

1980 births
Living people
Women's association football forwards
Bolivian women's footballers
People from Potosí Department
Bolivia women's international footballers